The 2017–18 Kennesaw State Owls women's basketball team represents Kennesaw State University during the 2017–18 NCAA Division I women's basketball season. The Owls, led by second year head coach Agnus Berenato, play their home games at the KSU Convocation Center and are members of the Atlantic Sun Conference. They finished the season 7–19, 3–11 in A-Sun play to finish in seventh place. They lost in the quarterfinals of the A-Sun Tournament to Jacksonville.

Roster

Schedule

|-
!colspan=9 style="background:#; color:white;"| Exhibition

|-
!colspan=9 style="background:#; color:white;"| Non-conference regular season

|-
!colspan=9 style="background:#; color:white;"| Atlantic Sun Conference season

|-
!colspan=9 style="background:#; color:white;"| Atlantic Sun Women's Tournament

Rankings
2017–18 NCAA Division I women's basketball rankings

See also
 2017–18 Kennesaw State Owls men's basketball team

References

Kennesaw State
Kennesaw State Owls women's basketball seasons